The celiac plexus, also known as the solar plexus because of its radiating nerve fibers, is a complex network of nerves located in the abdomen, near where the celiac trunk, superior mesenteric artery, and renal arteries branch from the abdominal aorta. It is behind the stomach and the omental bursa, and in front of the crura of the diaphragm, on the level of the first lumbar vertebra.

The plexus is formed in part by the greater and lesser splanchnic nerves of both sides, and fibers from the anterior and posterior vagal trunks.

The celiac plexus proper consists of the celiac ganglia with a network of interconnecting fibers.  The aorticorenal ganglia are often considered to be part of the celiac ganglia, and thus, part of the plexus.

Structure

The celiac plexus includes a number of smaller plexuses:

Other plexuses that are derived from the celiac plexus:

Terminology
The celiac plexus is often popularly referred to as the solar plexus. In the context of sparring or injury, a strike to the region of the stomach around the celiac plexus is commonly called a blow "to the solar plexus". In this case it is not the celiac plexus itself being referred to, but rather the region around it. A blow to this region may cause the diaphragm to spasm, resulting in difficulty in breathing—a sensation commonly known as "getting the wind knocked out of you". It may also affect the celiac plexus itself, which can cause great pain and interfere with the functioning of the viscera.

Clinical significance 

A blunt injury to the celiac plexus normally resolves with rest and deep breathing.

A celiac plexus block by means of fluoroscopically guided injection is sometimes used to treat intractable pain from cancers such as pancreatic cancer. Such a block may be performed by pain management specialists and radiologists, with CT scans for guidance.  

Intractable pain related to chronic pancreatitis may be an indication for celiac plexus ablation.

See also 

 Cardiac plexus
 Celiac ganglia
 Superior hypogastric plexus
Manipura

References

External links 

  - "Posterior Abdominal Wall: The Celiac Plexus"
 
 The Solar Plexus: Abdominal Brain By Theron Q. Dumont

Nerve plexus
Nerves of the torso
Vagus nerve